is Kotoko's ninth single, produced by I've Sound under the Geneon Entertainment label. The title track was used as the second opening theme for the anime series Hayate no Gotoku, episodes 27–52. It peaked at the #8 position in the Oricon charts and sold a total of 15,749 copies for two weeks. As of November 26, 2007, it has sold a total of 28,619 copies.

Track listing 
七転八起☆至上主義！ / Shichiten Hakki Shijou Shugi! -- 4:38
Composition: C.G mix
Arrangement: C.G mix
Lyrics: Kotoko
Scene—4:47
Composition: Kazuya Takase
Arrangement: Kazuya Takase
Lyrics: Kotoko
七転八起☆至上主義！ (Instrumental) / Shichiten Hakki Shijou Shugi! (Instrumental) -- 4:38
Scene (Instrumental) -- 4:44

Charts and sales

References

2007 singles
2007 songs
Kotoko (singer) songs
Hayate the Combat Butler songs
Song recordings produced by I've Sound
Songs with lyrics by Kotoko (musician)